Larinocerus is a genus of true bugs belonging to the family Miridae.

References

Miridae